The Lycée français Jean Monnet de Bruxelles (literally, the "Jean Monnet French High School of Brussels"), or LFB, is a school located in Uccle, Brussels, Belgium. A member of the Agency for French Education Abroad, the LFB follows the French study curriculum and has students from nursery school up to the French baccalauréat. As of 2020, the school hosted about 2719 students.

See also
 Education in France

References

External links

International schools in Brussels
Brussels
Uccle
1907 establishments in Belgium
Educational institutions established in 1907
Secondary schools in Brussels